But Seriously, Folks... is the fourth studio album by the American singer-songwriter and multi-instrumentalist Joe Walsh. The album was released in mid-1978, on the Asylum label. It included the satirical song "Life's Been Good". The original 8:04 (8:57 on CD releases with a speech at the end) album version of this track was edited down to 4:35 for single release, and this became Walsh's biggest solo hit, peaking at No. 12 on the Billboard Hot 100.

The album also featured the other four members of Eagles – which Walsh had joined two years earlier – as well as singer-keyboardist Jay Ferguson, a former member of the groups Spirit and Jo Jo Gunne (who co-wrote one track on the album), drummer Joe Vitale from Walsh's former band Barnstorm, and bassist Willie Weeks.

Critical reception

In a contemporary review for The Village Voice, Robert Christgau wrote that, although Walsh has "a gift for tuneful guitar schlock", most of the album's songs fall "far short of the irreverent shuck-and-jive" of "Life's Been Good". In a retrospective review, AllMusic's Al Campbell said that the album is "Joe Walsh's most insightful and melodic", and "captures a reflective song cycle along the same thematic lines of Pet Sounds, only for the '70s".

Cash Box said that the single "Over and Over" "has several distinctive rhythmic breaks, organ backing, swirling guitar work, slip and slide beat and good double-tracked vocals" and praised Walsh's slide guitar solo.

Track listing
All songs written and composed by Joe Walsh, except where noted.

Personnel
Musicians
 Joe Walsh – vocals, synthesizers, guitars
 Jay Ferguson – keyboards
 Joe Vitale – synthesizers, drums, percussion, flute, backing vocals (1-4, 7, 8)
 Joey Murcia – 2nd guitar
 Willie Weeks – bass

Guest musicians
 Don Felder – pedal steel guitar (2), guitar (4)
 Bill Szymczyk – tambourine (4), backing vocals (8)
 Jody Boyer – backing vocals (2, 3, 8)
 Glenn Frey – background vocal arrangements and backing vocals (6)
 Don Henley – backing vocals (6)
 Timothy B. Schmit – backing vocals (6)

Production
 Bill Szymczyk – producer, engineer, digital remastering
 Ed Mashal – engineer 
 Ted Jensen – mastering 
 Jimmy Wachtel – album design, cover photography, sleeve photography 
 Michael Curtis – design assistant 
 Mark Foltz – design assistant 
 Jage Jackson – design assistant 
 Lorrie Sullivan – sleeve photography
 Recorded at Bayshore Studios (Coconut Grove, Florida)
 Mastered at Sterling Sound (New York City, New York)

Charts

Certifications
 Canada-Platinum 
 US-Platinum 
 UK-Silver

References

Joe Walsh albums
1978 albums
Asylum Records albums
Elektra Records albums
Albums produced by Bill Szymczyk
Albums with cover art by Jimmy Wachtel
Albums produced by Joe Walsh